Wong Ngit Liong (born November 1941) is the Chairman of the Board and Chief Executive Officer of Venture Corporation which he founded in 1984.   In 2018, Venture Corporation had 15,000 employees.

Education and early career 
Wong holds a bachelor's degree in Electrical Engineering from the University of Malaya, a master's degree in Electronics Engineering from the University of California, Berkeley and a Master of Business Administration degree from McGill University.  Wong spent the first 12 years of his career with Hewlett-Packard (HP) where he held  various management positions at HP headquarters in Palo Alto, California, was actively engaged in the start-up of HP Singapore, and was the founding Director and General Manager of HP Malaysia.

Honors 
Wong was Chairman of the Board of Trustees of the National University of Singapore from 2004 to 2016.  During his tenure as Chairman, the National University of Singapore was transformed from a  local teaching institution dedicated to manpower development into a university which has been ranked as the 22nd best university in the world. In 2012, Wong was awarded a Meritorious Service Medal at the National Day Awards by the President of the Republic of Singapore. In 2018, he was awarded the Distinguished Service Order.

Wong has served on the Economic Development Board of the Government of Singapore.    Ernst and Young Singapore honored   Wong as its  Entrepreneur of the Year in 2002.

References

1941 births
Living people
Malaysian emigrants to Singapore
Recipients of the Pingat Jasa Gemilang
Recipients of the Darjah Utama Bakti Cemerlang
Singaporean businesspeople